Events in the year 2021 in Transnistria.

Incumbents 
 President of Transnistria: Vadim Krasnoselsky
 Prime Minister of Transnistria: Aleksandr Martynov
 Speaker of the Supreme Council: Alexander Korshunov

Events 
Ongoing – COVID-19 pandemic in Transnistria

July–December 
 6 August – Government officials refused to register the Romanian-language school the Lucian Blaga Theoretical Lyceum at Tiraspol and forced it to cease its activities for three months, affecting the school year of the students of the school and allegedly constituting a violation of several articles of the Convention on the Rights of the Child.
 6 December – Early voting begins for the 2021 presidential election, set on 12 December.
 12 December – The 2021 Transnistrian presidential election takes places, re-electing Vadim Krasnoselsky for another term with 87.04% of the vote, but with a significantly lower voter turnout compared to the 2016 presidential election.

Deaths

See also 

 2021 in Europe
 COVID-19 pandemic in Europe

References 

 
Transnistria
Transnistria
2020s in Transnistria
Years of the 21st century in Transnistria